Beyond a Reasonable Doubt is a 1956 film noir directed by Fritz Lang and written by Douglas Morrow. The film stars Dana Andrews, Joan Fontaine, Sidney Blackmer, and Arthur Franz. It was Lang's second film for producer Bert E. Friedlob, and the last American film he directed.

Plot
Austin Spencer (Sidney Blackmer), a newspaper publisher who opposes the death penalty, wants to prove a point about the inadequacy of circumstantial evidence. He talks his daughter's fiancé, Tom Garrett (Dana Andrews), into participating in a hoax, in an attempt to expose the ineptitude of the city's hard-line district attorney. The plan is for Tom to plant clues that will lead to his arrest for the recent murder of a female nightclub dancer, Patty Gray. Once Tom is found guilty, Spencer is to reveal the setup and humiliate the District Attorney.

Tom agrees to the plan, and is convicted on the circumstantial evidence. But Spencer dies in a car accident before he can clear Tom, and the photographic evidence he had intended to use to clear Tom after his trial is burned to an unrecognizable state. Tom remains on death row in prison. However, in time to prove the two men's intentions, written testimony by the dead man is discovered.  Because of this, Tom is to be pardoned.

However, while talking to his fiancée Susan (Joan Fontaine), Garrett reveals he knows the late woman's real name; this leads him to confess that the murder victim is actually his estranged wife, Emma Blucher, who had reneged on her promise to divorce him in Mexico. As this was preventing him from marrying Susan, he murdered her. Susan tells the police, and Garrett's pardon is canceled before the double jeopardy rule comes into effect, and the film closes with him being led back to his cell pending execution.

Cast
 Dana Andrews as Tom Garrett
 Joan Fontaine as Susan Spencer 
 Sidney Blackmer as Austin Spencer 
 Shepperd Strudwick as Jonathan Wilson
 Arthur Franz as Bob Hale 
 Philip Bourneuf as DA Roy Thompson
 Edward Binns as Lt. Kennedy
 Robin Raymond as Terry Larue
 Barbara Nichols as Dolly Moore
 Dan Seymour as Greco
 Rusty Lane as Judge
 Joyce Taylor as Joan Williams
 Carleton Young as Allan Kirk
 Joe Kirk as Clothing Store Clerk
 Charles Evans as Governor
 Wendell Niles as Announcer

Reception

Critical response
Keith M. Booker states that Beyond a Reasonable Doubt is "perhaps the bleakest of his [Lang's] American noir films". Dennis L. White describes the film as having "considerable impact, due not so much to visual style, but as to the narrative structure and mood and to the expertly devised plot, in which the turnabout is both surprising and convincing." Stella Bruzzi, author of Men's Cinema: Masculinity and Mise-en-Scene in Hollywood, felt that the film plot was "overly schematic" and "motivated by a paradox", affecting "an invisible, transparent style while, at the same time, being all about surface and performance". She adds that Lang "deploys an ostentatiously unintrusive 'classical' style", which he "purposefully reduces down to its minimalist bare necessities". Writer James McKay notes that Fontaine as Susan Spencer is "a little bit more forward than we normally expect, in a role that requires her to do all the running where her man's concerned".

Film critic Dennis Schwartz wrote a mixed review, but appreciated Lang's efforts, "Cheerlessly written with many plot holes, implausible contrivances and legal absurdities by law school graduate Douglas Morrow, though ably directed by film noir maven Fritz Lang (M/While the City Sleeps/Scarlet Street). Lang's last American film is a low-budget twisty courtroom drama about the dangers of capital punishment that ends up being about something more intangible--the unpredictability of fate ... But in this subversive film a perverse atmosphere of subliminal uncertainty prevails over the established surface reality, and the surprise ending comes as more of an emotional shock than as a real surprise--allowing the filmmaker to pass on his cynicism and disillusionment over the human condition. The stark, alluring and unconventional film is worth seeing for the ingenuous way it resolves the brain-teasing dilemma it raised."

See also
 The Man Who Dared (1946)
 The Life of David Gale (2003)
List of American films of 1956

References

External links

 
 
 
 
 Beyond a Reasonable Doubt information site and DVD review at DVD beaver (includes images)
 

1956 films
1956 drama films
American drama films
American black-and-white films
Film noir
Films about journalists
Films about capital punishment
Films directed by Fritz Lang
Films scored by Herschel Burke Gilbert
RKO Pictures films
1950s English-language films
1950s American films